This is a list of Japanese television series. The programs are listed alphabetically and are followed by the genre of the show and the date of the original run. For a chronological list, see List of Japanese television programs by date.

0–9
009-1 - Anime, 2006
8 Man - Anime, 1963-1964

A
Abarenbō Shōgun - Jidaigeki, 1978-2003, 2004, 2008
Ai no Gakko Cuore Monogatari - Anime, 1981
Aikurushii - Drama, 2005
Aim for the Ace! - Anime, 1973-1974, 1978-1979
Aim for the Ace! - Drama, 2004
Ainori - Reality show, 1999-2009
Akai Meiro
AKBingo! - Variety Show, 2008–present
Alfred J. Kwak - Anime, 1989-1990
All Night Fuji
Anchan
Aoi Sekai no Chūshin de - Anime, 2012
As the Bell Rings
Asayan - 1995-2002
Ashita ga Arusa - Drama, 2001
Asu no Hikari o Tsukame - Drama, 2011-2013
Attack No. 1 - Anime, 1969-1971
Attack No. 1 - Drama, 2005
Azumanga Daioh - Anime, 2002
Arcana Famiglia

B
Baby Felix - Anime, 2000-2001
Baldios - Anime, 1980-1981
Baribari Value - Game show, 2003–present
Bakugan - Anime, 2007–13
Baxinger - Anime, 1982-1983
Bayside Shakedown - Police drama, 1997, 1998
Beast King GoLion - Anime, 1981-1982
Binta! ~Bengoshi Jimuin Minowa ga Ai de Kaiketsushimasu~ - Drama, 2014
Bleach - Anime, 2004-2012(it will probably resume)
Blocker Gundan 4 Machine Blaster - Anime, 1976-1977
Bloodivores - Anime, 2016
Blue Comet SPT Layzner - Anime, 1985-1986
Blue Exorcist
Boruto: Naruto Next Generations - Anime, 2017
Bosco Adventure - Anime, 1986-1987
Braiger - Anime, 1981-1982
Brave Raideen - Anime, 1975-1976
Bumpety Boo - Anime, 1985-1986
Beyond The Boundary
Brothers' Conflict

C
Calimero - Anime, 1974-1975
Calimero - Anime, 1992-1993
Captain Future - Anime, 1978-1979
Cardcaptor Sakura - Anime, 1998-2000
Cat's Eye - Anime, 1983-1985
Cheating Craft - Anime, 2016
Chō Kōsoku Galvion - Anime, 1984
Chōdenji Machine Voltes V - Anime, 1977-1978
Chōdenji Robo Combattler V - Anime, 1976-1977
Chōgattai Majutsu Robo Ginguiser - Anime, 1977
Chōshichirō Edo Nikki - 1983-1991
Chōyū Sekai - Anime, 2017
Chousei Kantai Sazer-X - Tokusatsu, 2005-2006
Chouseishin Gransazer - Tokusatsu, 2003-2004
Close-up Gendai 
Cobra - Anime, 1982-1983
Code Geass - Anime, 2006-2008
Cowboy Bebop - Anime, 1998-1999
Crayon Shin-chan - Anime, 1992–present

D

Daichūshingura - Jidaigeki, 1971
Daitetsujin 17 - Tokusatsu, 1977
Daitokai
Daitokai Part II
Daitsuiseki
Daltanius - Anime, 1979-1980
Dancouga - Super Beast Machine God - Anime, 1985
Dansen
Dear Sister - Drama, 2014
Death Note - Drama, 2015
Demetan Croaker, The Boy Frog - Anime, 1973
Diabolik Lovers - Anime, 2013
Digimon Adventure - Anime, 1999 - 2000
Digimon Adventure 02 - Anime, 2000 - 2001
Digimon Adventure tri - Anime, upcoming
Digimon Frontier - Anime, 2002 - 2003
Digimon Savers - Anime, 2006 - 2007
Digimon Tamers - Anime, 2001 - 2002
Digimon Xros Wars - Anime, 2010 - 2012
Dirty Pair - Anime, 1985
Dokuganryū Masamune
Do Re Mi no TV - Educational
Doraemon (1973) - Anime, 1973
Doraemon (1979) - Anime, 1979 - 2005
Doraemon (2005) - Anime, 2005 - present
Dosanko Wide 179- News, 1991–present
Dotch Cooking Show - Cooking show, 1997-2005
Downtown no Gaki no Tsukai ya Arahende!! - Variety show, 1989–present
Downtown no Gottsu Ee Kanji - Variety show, 1991-1997
Dragon Ball - Anime (based on the manga), 1986–present
Doraemon - **Japanese Manga Series, December 1969-... Written By **Fujiko F. Fujio,**This Manga Series Is Showing In World Other Countries, **This Manga Is Most Famous In Kids, **This Manga Series Is 38 Movies 
Dragon Ball - 1986-1989
Dragon Ball GT - 1996-1997
Dragon Ball Kai - 2009-2015
Dragon Ball Z - 1989-1996
Dragon Ball Super - 2015–present
Dragon Zakura - Drama, 2005
Dr Slump - Anime (based on the manga), 1981-1986
Dynamic China - Documentary, 2007-2008

E
Edo o Kiru - Jidaigeki, 1973-2004
Eromanga Sensei - Anime, 2017
Evening 5 - News, 2005–2007

F
Fairy Tail - Anime, 2009 - 2013, 2014–present
Fighting Girl - Drama, 2001
Flame of Recca - Anime since 1997
FNN Date Line - News, 1987-1990
FNS Music Festival - Music show, 1974–present
Focus Tokushima - News, 1982–present
Food Fight - Drama, 2000
Friends - Drama, 2002
Fugo Keiji - Drama, 2005
Fullmetal Alchemist - Anime, 2003 – 2004
Fullmetal Alchemist: Brotherhood - Anime, 2009 - 2010
Fun TV with Kato-chan and Ken-chan - Variety show, 1986-1992
Fushigi no Kuni no Alice - Anime, 1983-1984
Fafner Exodus

G
Gaiji Keisatsu - Drama, 2009
Gaiking - Anime, 1976-1977, 2005-2006
Ganbaron - Tokusatsu, 1977
Garo - Tokusatsu, 2005
Genesis Climber MOSPEADA - Anime, 1983-1984
Genseishin Justirisers - Tokusatsu, 2004-2005
Getter Robo - Anime, 1974-1975
Getter Robo G - Anime, 1975-1976
Getter Robo Go - Anime, 1991-1992
Gilgamesh Night - Variety show, 1991-1998
Ginga: Nagareboshi Gin - Anime, 1986
Glay Global Communication - 2001
Gloizer X - Anime, 1976-1977
God Mazinger - Anime, 1984
Gokenin Zankurō - Jidaigeki, 1995-2002
Gold - Drama, 2010
GoShogun - Anime, 1981
Great Mazinger - Anime, 1974-1975
Golden Time
Good Morning Call - 2015

H
Hadaka no Shounen - Cooking show, 2001–present
Haikyuu- sport,comedy,   2014
Hakuba no Ōji-sama Junai Tekireiki - Drama, 2013
Hand Shakers - Anime, 2017 
Haromoni@ - Variety show, 2007-2008
Haru ga Kita
Haruka 17 - Drama, 2005
Hato no kyojitsu - 1953-2001, 2008–present
Heavy Metal L-Gaim - Anime, 1984-1985
Hello! Morning - Variety show, 2000-2007
Hello! Sandybell - Anime, 1981-1982
Hey! Hey! Hey! Music Champ - Variety show, 1994–present
Hey! Spring of Trivia - Variety show, 2002-2006
Hi Hi PUFFY Bu - Variety, 2006
High School! Kimengumi - Anime, 1985-1987
Hikari Ota's If I Were Prime Minister... Secretary Tanaka - Variety show, 2006–present
Himitsu no Hanazono - Drama, 2007
Honjitsu wa Taian Nari - Drama, 2012
How do you like Wednesday? - Variety show, 1996-2007
Huckleberry no Bouken - Anime, 1976
Hunter × Hunter Anime, 1999 - 2001
Hunter × Hunter Anime, 2011 - 2014

I
Idoling!!! - 2006–2015
The Idolmaster Cinderella Girls - Anime, 2015
Ikebukuro West Gate Park - Drama, 2000
Innocent Love - Drama, 2008
Invincible Steel Man Daitarn 3 - Anime, 1978-1979
Invincible Super Man Zambot 3 - Anime, 1977-1978
IQ Sapuri - 2004–2009
Iron Chef - Cooking show, 1993-1999
Ironfist Chinmi - Anime, 1988
Inuyasha - Anime, 2000-2005

J
J-Melo - Music show, 2005–present
Journey to the West
Jungle Book Shonen Mowgli - Anime, 1989-1990
Jushin Liger - Anime, 1989-1990
Jūsō Kikō Dancouga Nova - Anime, 2007

K
 Kaiju Booska - Tokusatsu, 1966-1967
 Kaiki Renai Sakusen - Drama, 2015
 Kaitai-Shin Show - 2007–present
 Kamen Rider - Action/adventure, 1971–present
 Kamen Rider Kiva
 Kami-sama Minarai: Himitsu no Cocotama - Anime, 2015
 Kamiwaza Wanda - Anime, 2016
 Karakuri Samurai Sesshaawan 1 - Tokusatsu, 2011
 Kareinaru Tsuiseki
 Kaseifu no Mita - Drama, 2011
 Kasou Taishou
 Kazoku no Katachi - Drama, 2016
 Keijo!!!!!!!! - Anime, 2016
 Kekkon Dekinai Otoko - Drama, 2006
 Kemono Friends - Anime, 2017
 Kikou Kantai Dairugger XV - Anime, 1982-1983
 Kimagure Orange Road - Anime, 1987-1988
 Kinniku Banzuke - Sports entertainment/variety show, 1995-2002
 Kinpachi-sensei - 1979–present
 Kitakubu Katsudō Kiroku - Anime, 2013
 Kodoku no Gourmet - Drama, 2012-ongoing
 Kōhaku Uta Gassen - Music show
 Koko ga hen da yo, nihonjin - 1998-2002
 Kometto-san - Dorama, 1967-1968
 Konna Koi no Hanashi - Drama, 1997
 Kotetsushin Jeeg - Anime, 2007
 Kunoichi
 Kamisama Kiss

L
Legend of Heavenly Sphere Shurato - Anime, 1989-1990
Liar Game - Drama, 2007
Lincoln - Variety show, 2005–present
Lucy of the Southern Rainbow - Anime, 1982

M
 Magical Girl Site - Anime, 2018
 Meganebu! - Anime, 2013
 Mentai Waido
 Mirai Sentai Timeranger
 Mitsu no Aji: A Taste of Honey - Drama, 2011
 Miyuki - Anime, 1983–1984
 Monkey
 Massan (2014-2015)
 My Hero Academia  -Anime, 2012

N
Nabari no Ou
Naruto - Anime,  2002 – 2007
Naruto Shippuden - Anime, 2007–present
Nazotoki wa Dinner no Ato de - Drama, 2011
New Dotch Cooking Show - Cooking show, 2005 - 2006, 2007
Neon Genesis Evangelion - Anime, 1995-1996
Nettai ya
New Game! - Anime, 2016
NHK News 7 - News, 1993–present
Nonchan Noriben, Drama, 1997, 1998
Nyanko Days, Anime, TBA
Ninja Hattori-kun

O
Obake no Q-tarō - Anime, 1965-1967, 1971-1972, 1985-1987
Ojamajo Doremi - Anime, 1999-2004
Omukae desu - Drama, 2016-scheduled
One Piece - Anime, 1999–present
One-Punch Man - Anime, 2015
Onna Goroshi Abura no Jigoku
Ookami Shoujo to Kuro Ouji - Anime, 2014
Ōoku
Oreimo - 2010-2013
Oretachi no Kunshō
Otoko wa Tsurai yo
Ou Otoko

P
Panel Quiz Attack 25 - Game show, 1975–present
Parasol Henbē - Anime, 1989-1991
Pokémon - Anime, 1997–present
Ponytail wa Furimukanai - Drama, 1985-1986
Popee the Performer - CGI Anime, 2001-2002
Poyopoyo Kansatsu Nikki - Anime, 2012
Pretty Cure - Anime, 2004–present
Princess Comet; Kometto-san - 1978, 1979
 Pripara - 2014–present; spin-off of the Pretty Rhythm series, idol anime
Pretty Rhythm Aurora Dream
Pretty Rhythm Dear My Future
Pretty Rhythm Rainbow Live

Q

R
RAB News Radar - News, 1970–present  (only in Aomori prefecture)
Ranma ½ - Anime, romantic/comedy/adventure, 1989 - 1992
Rasen - Drama/mystery, 1999
Rebound - Drama/romantic comedy, 2011
Ring: The Final Chapter - Drama/mystery, 1999
Robot Girls Z - Anime, comedy, slice of life, 2014
Rock Lee & His Ninja Pals - Anime, 2012 - 2013

S
Saint Seiya - Anime, 1986-1989
Saint Seiya Omega - Anime, 2012
Saiyūki
Sakurako wa Warau
Saraba Rōnin
Sasuke - Sports entertainment, 1997–present
Seiren - Anime, 2017
Selector Infected WIXOSS - Anime, 2014
Senhime Zesshō Symphogear - Anime, 2012
Shingeki no Kyojin - Anime, 2013
Shi no Dangai
Shin-Jiken Dr Stop
Shin-Yumechiyo Nikki
The Silver Guardian - Anime, 2017
SKE48 no Magical Radio - Variety show, 2011–present
SMAP×SMAP - Variety show, 1996–2016
Sono 'Okodawari', Watashi ni mo Kure yo!! - Drama, 2016
Sono toki Heartwa Nusumareta - Drama, 1992
ST Aka to Shirō no Sōsa File - 2014
Star Musketeer Bismark - Anime, 1984-1985
Sunao ni Narenakute - Drama, 2010
Super Seisyun Brothers - Anime, 2013
Super Sentai - Action/adventure, 1975–present

T 
 Taiga drama
 Taiyō ni Hoero!
 Takeda Shingen
 Takeshi's Castle - 1986-1989, 2005
 Tantei Monogatari
 Terrace House: Boys × Girls Next Door
 Terrace House: Boys & Girls in the City
 Terrace House: Aloha State
 To Be Hero - Anime, 2016
 Tokimeki Tonight - Anime, 1982-1983
 Tokyo Friend Park 2 - Game show, 1994–present
 Tokyo Ghoul
 Tokyo Market Express - News/talk show
 Tokyo Market Watch - News/talk show, 2001–present
 Tokyo Market Wrap - News/talk show, 2001–present
 Tokyo Mew Mew
 Tokyo Morning Express - News/talk show, 2003–present
 Tokyo Tarareba Musume - Drama, 2017
 Transformers - Anime, 1984-1987
 Truth or Doubt - 2004-2005
 Tokyo Alien Bros (2018)

U
UFO Warrior Dai Apolon - Anime, 1976 - 1977
Ultra Series - Tokusatsu, 1966–present
Ultraman Orb - 2016

V
Vermilion Pleasure Night - Comedy/variety show, 2000
Video Warrior Laserion - Anime, 1984-1985
Viking: The Ultimate Obstacle Course - Sports entertainment, 2005-2007

W
Wakakusa no Charlotte - Anime, 1977-1978
Waratte Iitomo! - Talk/Variety, 1982–present
Watashi ga Ren'ai Dekinai Riyū - Drama, 2011–present
Welcome to the El-Palacio - Drama, 2011

X
X - Anime, 2001-2002
Xam'd: Lost Memories - Anime, 2008–present

Y
YAT Anshin! Uchū Ryokō - Anime, 1996 - 1998
Yoru no Yatterman - Anime, 2015–present
You Gotta Quintet
Yu-Gi-Oh! - Anime, 1998
Yu-Gi-Oh! 5D's - Anime, 2008 - 2011
Yu-Gi-Oh! Arc-V - Anime, 2014 – 2017
Yu-Gi-Oh! Duel Monsters - Anime, 2000 - 2004
Yu-Gi-Oh! Duel Monsters GX - Anime, 2004 - 2008
Yu-Gi-Oh! Sevens - Anime, 2020 - present
Yu-Gi-Oh! VRAINS - Anime, 2017 - 2019
Yu-Gi-Oh! Zexal - Anime, 2011 - 2012
Yu-Gi-Oh! Zexal II - Anime, 2012 - 2014
Yuri on Ice - Anime, 2016
YuYu Hakusho - Anime, 1992 - 1995

Z
Za Gaman
Zatōichi monogatari
Zenigata Heiji - 1952–present

See also
Television in Japan
List of Japanese television dramas
Japanese television drama
Japanese science fiction television
Japanese variety show

 
Japan
Television in Japan